Settlers, Rails & Trails Inc. is a community-run, non-profit museum located in Argyle, Manitoba. It exhibits local history, railway and agricultural artifacts and historical information, and it is also home to the Canadian Flag Collection. Argyle is governed by the Rural Municipality of Rockwood, and is located approximately 28 km northwest of Winnipeg, within the Manitoba Capital Region.

History 
Began in 1991 as a school project under the name "Argyle Prairie Museum", the museum exhibited artifacts and local history in the basement of the Brant-Argyle School. The school is a provincial (Manitoba) historical site. In 1993, the museum was expanded to include the Ekhart railway station, and soon afterward a general store and blacksmith building. The museum was open to the public in the summer months and during Argyle’s Homecoming 2000 celebrations. Due to ongoing maintenance and operational demands, the museum continued collecting artifacts, but reduced its exhibition space and tours.

In February 2010, a group of motivated citizens from the Argyle area began exploring options for operating the museum as a community entity. In November 2010, the museum changed its name to Settlers, Rails & Trails while incorporating as a non-profit organization with the Manitoba Government.

SR&T became a member of the Canadian Heritage Information Network in March 2014 and hosts virtual displays at the Canadian Virtual Museum website.

Present day 
In 2019, the museum acquired a permanent 12-acre property north of the village on meridian road. Volunteers have begun developing the property by landscaping, adding security fence and gate, planting a native prairie preserve and moving three heritage buildings to the site. Plans are underway to develop a small Museum village, recreational trails, and construct a four season Pavilion structure that will act as the museum's headquarters.

Since 2014, the museum has used a space in the Argyle Community Centre for ongoing exhibitions for the public. Changing over time, the exhibits have been: Veterans of the Brant-Argyle Region, Brant-Argyle School 100th Anniversary, Canadian Flag Collection, Brant-Argyle United Church, agriculture in the Brant Argyle region, the Manitoba Brick and block Collection. 
In 2021 the museum launched a new concept: the Art and Culture Exhibition, a celebration of local artists. For the first time in Argyle, an art gallery has taken shape to highlight local talent.

As the museum grows, it continues to collect artifacts, provide research and educational tours to visitors.
In addition to programming based in Argyle, the museum also conducts off-site exhibits, displays and programming. The famous Canadian flag collection has been displayed in Manitoba's legislature seven times and could be found in Winnipeg's Millennium Library and Princess Auto corporate headquarters, Winnipeg.

We Will Remember Them - History of Veterans of Brant-Argyle Region (history book) was released in summer 2016. Voices of War theatrical production was specifically written for the museum and toured in fall 2015 including performances at Domain, Stonewall, Selkirk, Teulon and Argyle, Manitoba. The DVD version of the production was produced and released in Fall 2016 to coincide with Remembrance Day. The uniforms, props and artifacts from the production are on display in the museum's main gallery.

SR&T regularly holds events to mark National Flag of Canada Day each year on February 15. The museum conducts exhibits at local schools, and has created two displays in the Manitoba Legislature's rotunda. In 2016 the museum produced an exhibit highlighting the historic flags of Manitoba for that provincial flag's 50th anniversary.

Museum’s collection

Local artifacts and history 

There are over 1,500 artifacts in the museum’s collection in categories ranging from local history, agriculture, education, religion, business and railway exhibits. The museum continues to use the Ekhart railway station to house the Canadian railway artifacts and the general store building to display the items popular during the 1920s to 1970s. A blacksmith shop houses the agricultural artifacts as well as those familiar to the local smithy. Outside exhibits include a stretch of 60 lb rail containing four small pieces of rolling stock known as jiggers.

Veterans of the Brant-Argyle Region is an exhibit that honours the 173 veterans of the area. Artifacts from the Fenian Raids (1860s) to present-day Afghanistan, including photos, medals, uniforms and other artifacts, are on display.

In 2015 the museum wrote and produced a live theatrical production called Voices of War. A DVD and history book now encompass the story of this play.

Canadian Flag Collection 

The Canadian Flag Collection displayed at Settlers, Rails & Trails is a gathering of old and new flags that represent a variety of components of Canadian heritage and culture, in galleries separately dedicated to Canadian history, businesses, sports, regions, and special occasions. 

Settlers, Rails & Trails holds the second largest museum collection of flags in Canada. As of February 2021, the collection contains over 1,600 flags.
It is due to the CFC that the museum holds regional museum status, exhibiting flags and artifacts from across the country.

The CFC has been covered by CBC Radio, the Winnipeg Free Press, Stonewall Tribune, and Teulon Times. It has been featured in Flagscan, the journal of the Canadian Flag Association.

Manitoba Brick and Block Collection

In 2017 a small assortment of heritage masonry bricks were relocated to Argyle's museum. Over the last few years this unique provincial level collection has grown to incorporate many samples of masonry bricks from across Manitoba. In addition raw samples of clay and shale have been entered into the collections. The museum's goal is to gather two samples of every brick manufactured, from the almost 200 historic brick making sites across the province. The museum has also collected brick samples from important historic Manitoban buildings and structures.

Over the next few years the museum will develop a dedicated structure on the museum's property, for the Manitoba Brick and Block Collection.

References

External links 
 Settlers, Rails & Trails Museum
 Rockwood Echoes (book)
 Rockwood, 100 years of History (book)
 Winnipeg Free Press
 http://www.interlaketoday.ca/stonewallargusteulontimes
 http://www.stonewallteulontribune.com/
 http://www.cra-arc.gc.ca/ebci/haip/srch/charity-eng.action?r=http%3A%2F%2Fwww.cra-arc.gc.ca%3A80%2Febci%2Fhaip%2Fsrch%2Fbasicsearchresult-eng.action%3Fk%3Dsettlers%2Brails%2B%2526%2Btrails%2Binc%26amp%3Bs%3Dregistered%26amp%3Bp%3D1%26amp%3Bb%3Dtrue&bn=837720804RR0001 (Revenue Canada Agency listing of SR&T)
http://www.pro.rcip-chin.gc.ca/GetMember.do?lang=en&id=guaevb&ens=cnRsTGFuZz1lbg== (Canadian Heritage Information Network listing of SR&T)

History museums in Manitoba